The seventh series of the BBC espionage television series Spooks (known as MI-5 in the United States) began broadcasting on 27 October 2008 on BBC One before ending on 8 December 2008 on the same channel, and consists of eight episodes, two fewer than previous series. It follows the actions of Section D, a counter-terrorism division in MI5. The primary storyline involves Sugarhorse, a top secret operation set up by MI5 during the final years of the Cold War, and a mole working for the FSB who intends to leak the operation to the Russians. Peter Firth, Rupert Penry-Jones, Hermione Norris, Richard Armitage, Miranda Raison, Gemma Jones, Hugh Simon and Alex Lanipekun are credited as the main cast.

Penry-Jones announced his intention to leave the series in December 2007, while it was later announced Armitage would join. Norris and Raison were both asked back after their characters were left open to return at the end of the last series. In developing the series, the producers wanted to repeat the serialised style from series six, and settled on using the resurgence of Russia as the primary storyline as they felt it was, at the time, subtly threatening the security of the West. The producers also participated in several meetings with the writers to discuss the purpose of Sugarhorse. Filming started in London in March 2008, and finished in August 2008 in Moscow, the first time in series history where Spooks was filmed outside the United Kingdom.

The seventh series received healthy ratings, with both BBC One and BBC Three ratings together achieving 6.13 million viewers per episode. The series also attracted critical acclaim, with some reviewers considering it to be the best series of Spooks so far. Both factors allowed the BBC to commission an eighth series of the programme for 2009. The seventh series was released on DVD on 12 October 2009 in the United Kingdom, 30 March 2009 in Australia, and 26 January 2010 in the United States.

Episodes

Cast

The series consists of eight main cast members. Rupert Penry-Jones returned as Adam Carter for the first episode. In December 2007 Penry-Jones announced his intention to leave the series after appearing on the show for four years, because he felt his character had run its course and "getting to the point where I needed to move on," adding he would like to explore other avenues in his career. To keep the series fresh, the producers still wanted Adam's exit to be a shock to the audience. The actor found that his last days on Spooks were generally upsetting and "welled up" on his final day.

In March 2008 the BBC announced that Richard Armitage would join the series as Lucas North. The character was designed by the producers to become a "new heroic figure", and to become much more distant than Adam. Armitage was chosen early in the casting process as the producers believed he could carry the mystery of the character. Armitage was approached by the producers after he finished work on the second series of Robin Hood in which he portrayed the regular part of Sir Guy of Gisbourne. He accepted the role but was initially hesitant to join because of the "tall order" of replacing Penry-Jones. Armitage lost a stone in weight in preparation to keep with the description that Lucas is malnourished in the first episode, but still kept physically fit.

Elsewhere, Hermione Norris returns as Ros Myers. The character was initially written off after the eighth episode of the sixth series due to the actress's pregnancy, however when the seventh series entered pre-production, Norris was asked to return and she accepted. Miranda Raison also returned as Jo Portman. The cliffhanger of the sixth series finale, where Jo was apparently killed, was to leave the audience wondering whether she survived. Raison stated that she realised the producers wanted her to return, as did she. Alex Lanipekun returned as Ben Kaplan, and was upgraded to a series regular. Lanipekun believed that the seventh series was "kind of for Ben," adding that there was an episode that would see his coming of age by dealing with his first undercover operation and the burden of getting close to someone who is involved with the group he was sent to stop. Peter Firth, Gemma Jones and Hugh Simon returned as Harry Pearce, Connie James and Malcolm Wynn-Jones, respectively.

Production

Writing
The writers and producers got together to discuss what direction they would take for the seventh series. They wanted to repeat the same style for series six, which was to add a serial element to be carried throughout the duration of the series. They got together to think about what they would believe to be a big political story that would affect politics in the United Kingdom in within twelve to eighteen months after their initial meetings early in 2008. They settled on using Russia, which was facing a resurgence in power after the Cold War, which the producers felt, in subtle ways, would threaten the security of the west. Sometime through the writing process, the producers set up a story-arc, Sugarhorse, to be a threat throughout the series and have it resolved by the finale. The writers enjoyed making the Sugarhorse storyline because it was one of the instances that "really brings Harry to the edge" and causing him to doubt everything he has done or achieved. The writing team took several meetings together to discuss what it is and how it should work into the storyline. Christian Spurrier noted it was "kind of a headache" to figure out how to "weave it in" to the series and work out what parts would be used in which episodes. The producers wanted to use a scene relating to Sugarhorse as the finale scene of every episode it was featured in, as the producers believed it would provide a "right hook" to the audience. Adding the new storyline would allow the series to return to the world of spying, truth, and who the characters should trust.

Throughout the writing process, several cast members would give suggestion notes to the writers on how to improve some scenes. The writers were frequently annoyed with Armitage, who gave out more notes than any other cast members, however the writers also liked some of his ideas and included them in the scripts. The producers believed that the seventh series was among the more brutal than the others, citing the violent death of Ben.

Filming

Filming started in March 2008, and finished in August of the same year. Before principal photography commenced, director Colm McCarthy participated in helicopter shots over London. In each block of episodes, the cast and crew would often film all scenes held in certain locations at once, for instance all scenes set on the Grid, although taking place in different parts of each episodes, would all be filmed together before moving on to another set. However, the cast had trouble following the storylines with this method. A different Director of Photography was hired in each episode. Because of this, the filming style inside the Grid set changed in every episode. To film public shots, a small film crew was used so as to not attract too much attention from passers by. However, by using the small crew, they and the actors generally film the scenes unnoticed by the public, which the producers felt gave the characters such gravitas.

Filming finished in August 2008 in Moscow, Russia; it was the first time in series history where filming took place outside the United Kingdom; producer Katie Swinden stated that Spooks is usually "London-orientated," including when it comes to filming scenes set in other countries, and it usually does not take place outside the confines of the M25, the orbital motorway which encircles the UK's capital. However, the producers were able to afford to shoot in another country. A small crew was used to save costs. Armitage and Norris were the only two of the main actors who participated in the shoot. However, the main problem with filming in Moscow was the -plus heat, and the actors had to wear winter coats because the episodes were set during the colder months.

Stunts
The producers allow the cast to perform many of their own stunts. In filming fight sequences, they were carefully choreographed beforehand so the actors could participate themselves. The guns featured on the series are real. In scenes where guns are included, an armourer is on hand throughout the entirety of the sequence to see if the actors are handling them properly and gives out the guns to the actors at the last possible second before filming. After the sequence is shot, the guns have to be returned and locked in a case to prevent anybody from playing with them, even if the guns are not loaded. Among other stunt work, Armitage was asked to be subjected to an actual waterboarding scene to ensure the authenticity of the sequence. The actor agreed after he was convinced by consultants from the FSB and CIA. Kudos film and television, the production company behind Spooks, had to follow several health and safety provisions from an advisor to ensure the sequence strictly adheres to the advice. The advisor and a medic were present during filming. Armitage was only waterboarded for a short time, and was filmed in slow motion to make it appear as if he was on for longer. The ambient temperature of the room was also raised to make Armitage as comfortable as possible. Following the sequence, Armitage stated "I only lasted five to ten seconds, and the sound of my voice crying out to stop isn't me acting."

Broadcast and reception

Broadcast and ratings
The series was broadcast every Monday from 27 October to 8 December 2008 on BBC One, with the exception of the second episode, which aired on a Tuesday, the day after the first episode. However, the second through to the seventh episodes were repeated on BBC Three sometime after the BBC One broadcasts of the previous episode. The first episode "New Allegiances" was seen by 5.5 million and was given a strong audience share of 23.4 per cent. Although ratings were high, the premiere was down from the 6.6 million seen by the premiere of the previous sixth series. Some of the later episodes faced heavy competition from I'm a Celebrity, Get Me Out of Here! on ITV1, however despite this, ratings for Spooks remained steady. The finale "Nuclear Strike" gave the seventh series its strongest ratings, with six million viewers. Combining both BBC One and BBC Three viewings, viewing figures for the seventh series averaged 6.13 million per episode. The series also became the ninth most watched series from BBC iPlayer, an Internet television service, of 2008.

Critical reception

The seventh series attracted critical acclaim, with some reviewers considering it to be the best series of Spooks. Leigh Holmwood of The Guardian feared that the death of Adam "would have cast a long shadow", but barely noticed his absence given the pace of the episodes. Holmwood also believed that Lucas's introduction "more than made amends" for replacing Adam, and also felt the return of Ros Myers and her promotion was "a genius move". Mark Wright of The Stage thought that it was "stunning" with the last three episodes in particular "hitting new heights of tension and storytelling for the series," adding it is "as good as, if not the better, than the first couple of seasons". Wright also believed the series performed well with a reduced series length of eight as opposed to the ten episodes from the last few series, which he said allowed for "tighter, more focussed storytelling". He also felt the cast changes "always felt naturally organic", and praised Adam's exit, Lucas's introduction, and the "fantastic, strong female role model" of Hermione Norris's portrayal. Wright ended by saying "Spooks has been my favourite show of the last few months and indeed of 2008".

Mof Gimmers of TV Scoop named Spooks series seven as the best television show of 2008 out of 50 programmes. Gimmers felt the seventh series performed better than the previous, as it "lost its way slightly" with the concentration of Islamic extremists. The seventh series however, was praised for bringing back the more traditional enemy, the Russians. With the introduction of Lucas North, Gimmers stated "the possibilities for double-blinding the audience were legion and every single one was exploited to the max". Gimmers also cited the more "pacy" plots due to a shorter series as another factor of the series's success, and also said "the only problem with having a series as good as this in the bag is how they will match it next year?". David Blackwell of Enterline Media said that the series's storylines "have a grain of truth reflecting today's climate" and also "more deeply rooted in gritty realism and preying on the real dangers that terrorists and other countries pose to the UK". Blackwell also posed the storylines also "keeps the characters human and show what they go through" and reacted positively towards Lucas's introduction, stating "I like Lucas North better than Adam Carter or Tom Quinn. His dark and conflicted persona adds to the story and makes him a more interesting character than Adam or Tom ever were". Blackwell summed up the series as "as great as the first six seasons. The show maintains a high standard of quality".

Following the end of the eighth series, Last Broadcast held a poll for the top five most shocking death scenes in Spooks. Two of them were deaths from the seventh series. Adam Carter's death was voted the fourth most shocking, while Ben Kaplan's death was voted third. Connie's death however, was not listed. The featuring of an actual waterboarding scene drew criticism from Guardian columnist Zoe Williams, who wrote "it's really unpleasant, [Armitage] concurred. 'I only lasted five to 10 seconds, and the sound of my voice crying out to stop isn't me acting.' Pal, that's nice that you're not showing off but this is all wrong and despicable: it's like locking yourself and 10 friends into a loo on a commuter train, to see what it would be like on the train to Auschwitz. If you can make it stop whenever you like, you're learning nothing and kicking people in the face while you're at it".

Award nomination and renewal
The seventh series was nominated for a British Academy Television Award (BAFTA) for "Best Drama Series" in 2009, but lost to Wallander. Because of the strong ratings and positive feedback from fans and critics, the BBC announced they would recommission Spooks for an eighth series for 2009 on 4 December 2008, just days before the finale was set to air.

Home video release
The series has been released on DVD in the United Kingdom (Region 2) on 12 October 2009. It was also released in the United States (Region 1) on 26 January 2010, and in Australia (Region 4) on 30 March 2009. The set consists of four discs and contain all eight episodes, as well as a few special features, including a Behind the Scenes documentary, which contain cast and crew interviews covering the characters and storylines of the series, "Spooks in Russia", a featurette behind the scenes of filming in Russia, "Action Sequence", which covers filming a chase sequence in episode six, and audio commentaries for episodes five and eight. The box set also contains the original trailer for the series, while the Region 1 release also contains trailers for other British television programmes, including Doctor Who, Torchwood and Primeval.

Notes

References

External links
 

2008 British television seasons
Spooks (TV series)